Tawarja Dam, is an earthfill dam on Tawarja river near Ausa, Latur district in the state of Maharashtra in India.

Specifications

Purpose
 Irrigation

See also
 Dams in Maharashtra
 List of reservoirs and dams in India

References

Dams in Latur district
Dams completed in 1982
1982 establishments in Maharashtra
20th-century architecture in India